Belle Grove, also known as Belle Grove Plantation, was a plantation and elaborate Greek Revival and Italianate-style plantation mansion near White Castle in Iberville Parish, Louisiana. Completed in 1857, it was one of the largest mansions ever built in the Southern United States, surpassing that of the neighboring Nottoway, today cited as the largest antebellum plantation house remaining in the South.

History

Belle Grove was owned by John Andrews, a wealthy sugar planter originally from Virginia. He owned over  spread over several plantations, with Belle Grove having  of river frontage. He founded Belle Grove during the 1830s, with Dr. John Phillip Read Stone as a partner. Andrews assumed full ownership in 1844 when the partnership was dissolved. By the 1850s, the more than 150 people, mostly slaves, were producing over one-half million pounds of sugar each year.

Andrews built the mansion from 1852 to 1857 at a cost of $80,000, not including the labor or the plentiful cypress lumber and hand-made bricks produced on the plantation. The house was designed by New Orleans architect Henry Howard. Andrews had a legendary rivalry with the owner of Nottoway Plantation, John Randolph. This competition even extended to their mansions, with both massive structures designed by Howard in a mix of the Greek Revival and Italianate styles.

Following the American Civil War and ensuing collapse of the plantation economy, Andrews sold the home and plantation in 1868 to Henry Ware, for the meager sum of $50,000. Ware and his descendants owned and operated the plantation for 65 years, and two of his sons, James Andrew Ware and John M. Ware, eventually acquired it. James married Mary Eliza Stone and John married Marie-Louise Dupré, who was related to Jacque Dupré, former governor of Louisiana. Every first-born daughter was named Marie-Louise in straight succession for four generations since. (Marie-Louise Ware Castillo source) 

Eventually, James and Mary Eliza Stone acquired the entire estate and John and Marie-Louise owned Dixon Grove plantation. After several years of crop failures, John Ware and his wife left in 1924. 

The post-War era at Belle Grove saw the finely crafted home rot away in Louisiana's harsh environment. Neglect allowed a roof leak to expand and destroy one wing. Several owners purchased the home, each with aspirations to restore it, but none had the means in the lean years of the Great Depression and World War II to stop the onslaught of rapid decay. On March 17, 1952, a mysterious fire during the night destroyed what remained of the house.

Dozens of books have been written about Belle Grove's beauty and charm, and hundreds of photographs of it have been published. During the late 1930s a comprehensive set of photos and architectural drawings were produced for the Historic American Buildings Survey. This material, an inventory of the house's contents made on the death of Isayah E. Henry in 1908, and a drawing of the missing wing, are available on the website of the Library of Congress.

Photographer Clarence John Laughlin described Belle Grove in his work, Ghosts Along the Mississippi:

When completed, its tremendous mass rose on huge brick foundation arches over twelve feet above the surrounding earth, its walls and mantels were plastered and carved by the most expert European craftsmen money could secure, its great flight of brick steps was covered with imported marble, its door knobs and keyhole guards were of silver, its pillars bore Corinthian capitals six feet high but of the utmost refinement. Its theatrical magnificence would have delighted the Bibiena family - seventeenth century designers of the most elaborate and grandiose stage sets for kings. Yet it was not heavy, or pompous. It managed somehow, to combine vastness with delicacy; titanic proportions with grace and warmth....

See also
Belle Grove (Terrebonne Parish, Louisiana), on Bayou Black

References

External links

Friends of Belle Grove Plantation of Louisiana Website
Belle Grove Plantation Records, University of North Carolina at Chapel Hill

Antebellum architecture
Historic American Buildings Survey in Louisiana
Houses completed in 1857
Sugar plantations in Louisiana
Demolished buildings and structures in Louisiana
Houses in Iberville Parish, Louisiana
Greek Revival houses in Louisiana
Italianate architecture in Louisiana
Plantation houses in Louisiana
Burned houses in the United States
1857 establishments in Louisiana
Gilded Age mansions